Bakarić is a surname. Notable people with the surname include:

 Frano Bakarić (born 1977), Croatian sprinter
 Saša Bakarić (born 1987), Slovenian football player
 Vladimir Bakarić (1912–1983), Yugoslav Croatian politician

Croatian surnames